Benny Moss (born April 18, 1970) is an American former basketball player and the former men's basketball coach at UNC Wilmington. He is currently an assistant coach at Coastal Carolina

Born in Winston-Salem, North Carolina, Moss received his bachelor's and master's degrees at UNC Charlotte where he played for coach Jeff Mullins.  He began his coaching career in 1993 as an assistant at Pfeiffer University near Charlotte.  He also served as an assistant coach at Phillips University and Henderson State University before returning to Charlotte in 2000 where he served as an assistant coach at Charotte under Bobby Lutz for six seasons before taking the helm at UNCW. On January 28, 2010, Moss was reassigned at UNCW.

Head coaching record

References

External links
Official Benny Moss bio

1970 births
Living people
Basketball players from Winston-Salem, North Carolina
Charlotte 49ers men's basketball coaches
Charlotte 49ers men's basketball players
Coastal Carolina Chanticleers men's basketball coaches
College men's basketball head coaches in the United States
Henderson State Reddies men's basketball coaches
Pfeiffer Falcons men's basketball coaches
Pfeiffer Falcons men's basketball players
Phillips Haymakers men's basketball coaches
UNC Wilmington Seahawks men's basketball coaches
American men's basketball players
Basketball coaches from North Carolina